George M. "Potsy" Clark (March 20, 1894 – November 8, 1972) was an American football and baseball player, coach, and athletics administrator. He served as the head football coach at Michigan Agricultural College, now Michigan State University, (1920), the University of Kansas (1921–1925), Butler University (1927–1929), and the University of Nebraska–Lincoln (1945, 1948), compiling a career college football record of 40–45–7. Clark was also the head coach of the National Football League's Portsmouth Spartans/Detroit Lions (1931–1936, 1940) and Brooklyn Dodgers (1937–1938), amassing a career NFL mark of 64–42–12. Clark's 1935 Detroit Lions team won the NFL Championship. From 1945 to 1953, Clark served as the athletic director at Nebraska.

Head coaching record

College football

NFL

See also
 List of college football head coaches with non-consecutive tenure

References

1894 births
1972 deaths
American football quarterbacks
Brooklyn Dodgers (NFL) coaches
Butler Bulldogs athletic directors
Butler Bulldogs baseball coaches
Butler Bulldogs football coaches
Detroit Lions head coaches
Illinois Fighting Illini baseball coaches
Illinois Fighting Illini baseball players
Illinois Fighting Illini football coaches
Illinois Fighting Illini football players
Kansas Jayhawks baseball coaches
Kansas Jayhawks football coaches
Michigan State Spartans baseball coaches
Michigan State Spartans football coaches
Minnesota Golden Gophers baseball coaches
Minnesota Golden Gophers football coaches
Nebraska Cornhuskers athletic directors
Nebraska Cornhuskers football coaches
Pensacola Naval Air Station Goslings football coaches
Saint Mary's Pre-Flight Air Devils football coaches
People from Carthage, Illinois